United Nations Sacco Society (UN SACCO) Limited is a credit union founded in 1975 to provide banking services to United Nations employees in Kenya. The Sacco is based in Nairobi and now has members worldwide. Membership is open to all staff of UN agencies.

The organization started with 131 members in 1975 and had 5,120 by December 2015. In the same period, members' deposits grew from KES 290,000 to Kshs 7.8 billion. The total asset capitalization by end of 2015 stood at KES 10.1 billion (US$100 million) while the share capital is at KES 614 million.

CPA Dr. Nebart Avutswa is the Chief Executive Officer.

Milestones
 The Sacco businesses commenced in 1975 under the Chairmanship of Ms. Teresa Muigai. Subsequent Chairpersons are: Mr. John Nyaga, Mr. Alexander Alusa, Ms. Mary Githiomi, Ms. Mary Odhiambo, Mr. Kimani Macharia, Mr. Dennis Kerina and Eng. Samuel Olago.
 The business office was in block G with a workforce of four staff and a membership of 131 and a share capital (members' deposits) of KES 290,354
 The objective was and has been to provide a forum for United Nations employees in Kenya to consolidate part of their disposable income and benefits by saving and borrowing from the society at minimal cost to meet their socio-economic needs, the membership is drawn from the 14 United Nations Agencies and the World Bank, non UN Agencies are 6 which include UN Sacco, UNFCU, TSBF CIAT, Retirees
 The society has grown from 131 members in 1975 to the 5,120 members be end of 2015
 The society's asset base as of 2015 stood at KES 10.1 billion with member deposits at KES 7.8 billion, with a loan book of about KES 7.1 billion
 The current UN Sacco offices were built in 2004 and opened its doors to our members on 7 December 2004.
 The website www.unsacco.unon was launched in 2004
 The FOSA started operations in 2006
 Dividend payout over the years has grown from 6% in early 2000 to 15% in 2009; in 2010 following the commencement of regulations where Sacco's were required to separate Share Capital from Deposits and dividends from interest on deposits respectively, the UN Sacco issued bonus shares to all the members who were in the register as at 31 December 2009. For the last four years from 2010 the dividend payout has been at 20% while the interest on deposits at 13.5% on average
 In the Cooperative movement in Kenya, the UN Sacco has been recognized as the 6th largest Sacco in terms of share capital and members deposits; it was among the pioneer 7 Sacco's which were the first to be registered by Sacco Societies Regulatory Authority (SASRA) after fulfilling all the required conditions; SASRA is to the Cooperative movement what the central bank is to the banking industry.
 There are over 10 loan products, some are popular and others are not commonly used; we encourage members to patronize all the products; in the FOSA there are more than 4 types of accounts.
 To enable its member access their funds easily the Sacco has subscribed to Cooperative Bank of Kenya SACCO-LINK, it is a VISA debit card, therefore members can access their accounts from anywhere in the world where there is VISA access
 The UN Sacco has also subscribed to the MSACCO; this allows members to access funds through the mobile cash transfer anywhere at any time.
 In the year 2015, the Sacco launched a 15-year asset loan being brain child of the then Treasurer, Mr Charles Wambua. The product is one of a first ever to be offered by any Sacco in Africa. It has the longest term  featuring a competitive fixed rate over the loan term on reducing balance.

References

External links

Credit unions of Kenya
Banks established in 1975